Bob, BOB, or B.O.B. may refer to:

People, fictional characters, and named animals
Bob (given name), a list of people and fictional characters
Bob (surname)
Bob (dog), a dog that received the Dickin Medal for bravery in World War II
Bob the Railway Dog, a part of South Australian Railways folklore

Places
Mount Bob, New York, United States
Bob Island, Palmer Archipelago, Antarctica

Television, games, and radio
Bob (TV series), an American comedy series starring Bob Newhart
B.O.B. (video game), a side-scrolling shooter
Bob FM, on-air brand of a number of FM radio stations in North America

Music

Musicians and groups
B.o.B (born 1988), American rapper and record producer
Bob (band), a British indie pop band
The Bobs, an American a cappella group
Boyz on Block, a British pop supergroup

Songs
"B.O.B" (song), by OutKast
"Bob" ("Weird Al" Yankovic song), from the 2003 album Poodle Hat by "Weird Al" Yankovic
"Bob", a song from the album Brighter Than Creation's Dark by the Drive-By Truckers
"Bob", a song from the album White Trash, Two Heebs and a Bean by NOFX
"Bob", a song from the album Pork Soda by Primus
"Bob", a song from the album One Hot Minute by the Red Hot Chili Peppers
"The Bob (Medley)", a song from Roxy Music's self-titled album

Science and technology
Bob (physics), the mass at the end of a pendulum
BOB (psychedelic), a drug
Alice and Bob, placeholder characters in cryptography and physics problems
Blitter object, a graphics construct
Hurricane Bob (disambiguation)
Microsoft Bob, a software product

Acronyms
Bank of Baroda, in India
Bank of Botswana
Bank One Ballpark, now Chase Field
Bayerische Oberlandbahn, a private German railway company
Beijing Olympic Broadcasting
Bend Over Boyfriend, slang term for a sexual practice
Berlin Operating Base, the CIA station in Berlin during the Cold War
Berner Oberland Bahn, a mountain railway in Switzerland
Best of Biotech, a business plan competition organized by Austria Wirtschaftsservice
Boys of Bangladesh, a network of gay men in Bangladesh
Breakout board, a minimal printed circuit board with a single component
Bug-out bag, an evacuation kit
Buy on board, food or beverages purchased in-flight

Codes
Aweer language ISO 639-3 code
Bolivian boliviano ISO 4217 currency code
Bora Bora Airport IATA code

Other uses
 Bob, a slang term in Great Britain for the pre-decimal coin, the shilling
 Bob, short for bobsleigh or bobsled
 Bob cut, a hairstyle

See also
Bob's (disambiguation)